Jerry Krause (born April 3, 1936) is the former director of basketball operations for Gonzaga University between 1985 to 2015. Before joining Gonzaga, Krause primarily worked as a basketball coach at high schools in Iowa and Loveland, Colorado from 1959 to 1964. After he moved to varsity basketball in 1964, Krause was an assistant coach for Colorado State College until 1967. From 1967 to 1985, Krause primarily coached at Eastern Washington University for their men's basketball team. With Eastern Washington, Krause had 291 wins and 197 losses before he became an assistant coach for the university from 1993 to 1994.

As an executive, Krause became the research committee chairperson for the National Association of Basketball Coaches in 1966. While continuing to hold his research chair until the 2010s, Krause was the rules chair for NCAA basketball in the late 1980s. In 1992, Krause co-invented a tool to measure the tension of basketball rims. From the NABC, Krause received the Cliff Wells Appreciation Award in 1998 and a Guardians of the Game Pillar Award in 2003. Krause joined the National Collegiate Basketball Hall of Fame in 2022.

Early life and education
Krause's birth occurred in Cedar Bluffs, Nebraska on April 3, 1936. He grew up with four siblings while living on a farm. After the death of his parents during his childhood, Krause lived with his uncle and aunt. He played multiple sports before attending post-secondary education.

In the early 1950s, Krause went to the University of Nebraska for an engineering program. He then withdrew from Nebraska for a teacher's program at Wayne State College during the mid 1950s. During the 1960s, Krause studied math and biomechanics at Colorado State College.

Career

High school
In 1959, Krause was an assistant football coach for Adair-Casey. During his time at Afair-Casey, Krause held coaching positions in athletics and basketball by 1961. Upon ending his coaching tenure with the Iowa high school that year, Krause had 32 wins and 13 losses in boys basketball.

During November 1961, Krause went to Loveland, Colorado and joined Berthoud as a coach. In 1964, his boys basketball team qualified for the Colorado State Basketball Tournament after Berthoud won the North Central District B title. During the B division boys basketball championship held by the Colorado High School Activities Association that year, Berthoud won the consolation game.

University
While at Colorado between 1965 to 1967, Krause worked as an assistant basketball coach for the university. In 1967, Krause became the men's basketball coach for Eastern Washington University in the NAIA. While with Eastern Washington, his team joined the NCAA Division II in 1977. Upon starting a sabbatical from Eastern Washington in 1982, Krause went to Oregon State University and coached their basketball team as a volunteer. 

The following year, Krause resumed his coaching position with Eastern Washington. During his second tenure with Eastern Washington, his team played in the NCAA Division I from 1983 to 1985. Krause lost his Eastern Washington  coaching position in January 1985 and remained with the basketball team until March 1985. Krause had a combined total of 261 wins and 197 losses with Eastern Washington.

In August 1985, Krause became a volunteer basketball coach for Gonzaga University. By 1987, Krause was also in charge of physical education for Eastern Washington. The following year, Krause was promoted by Gonzaga to part-time. Krause's tenure at Eastern Washington as their chair had ended by January 1991.

Krause became an assistant coach for Eastern Washington's men's basketball team in 1993. He remained with Eastern Washington until 1994. In 2001, Krause started working as the director of basketball operations for Gonzaga. He primarily worked as a scheduler while in his director position with Gonzaga. Krause ended his career with Gonzaga in 2015.

Executive and other positions
As an chairperson, Krause began leading the research committee for the National Association of Basketball Coaches in 1966. By 1992, he had held the position for over 25 years. He continued to work with the NABC as their chair in research during the 2000s and 2010s. While with the NABC, Krause was the president of their NAIA section from 1979 to 1980. He also joined the NABC's board of directors in 1979 and was scheduled to end his tenure in 1991. In 1981, Krause was an assistant coach at the men's basketball event during the U.S. Olympic Festival.

From 1984 to 1992, Krause worked on a rim measuring tool as a co-inventor with Bruce Abbott. With his invention, Krause spent five years measuring the tension of basketball rims. In 1992, the NCAA "set recommendations on the proper tension" after speaking with Krause. The NCAA Division I began measuring the tension of their basketball rims in 2004 "prior to the season, before every conference tournament, and at all NCAA Tournament venues."

During 1986, Krause became the rules chairperson for the NCAA in basketball. When he was with the committee for the NCAA in 1987, Krause believed that the shot clock, three-pointers and the halfcourt divider should be removed from their basketball games. By 1988, Krause's chair position with the NCAA had ended. While he was a part of the Basketball Rules Committee for the NCAA in 1991, Krause worked for the National Basketball Hall of Fame as an inductee elector.

While working as an assistant coach for Gonzaga and as a professor for Eastern Washington in October 1991, the United States Military Academy gave Krause a visiting professor position. He worked at the Military Academy the following year. Krause resumed his USMA experience from 1996 to 2001. During this time period, Krause led their physical education section and taught philosophy of sport as a professor. He had over 60 released works in basketball by 2005, with the majority of them being movies and books. Krause used John Wooden's lessons as his basis to create the "Be Like Coach" initiative for children at St. Aloysius Gonzaga Catholic School in 2012.

Awards and honors
Krause received the Cliff Wells Appreciation Award in 1998 from the National Association of Basketball Coaches. In 2003, he was given a Guardians of the Game Pillar Award in the advocacy category by the NABC. From individual universities, Krause received the Contribution of Sport Award from the University of Northern Colorado in 2001. In 2007, Krause was presented with the Alumni Achievement Award from Wayne State College.

For hall of fames, he was selected to join the NAIA Hall of Fame in 2000 and the Eastern Washington University Athletics Hall of Fame in 2005. During 2013, Krause became part of the Inland Northwest Sports Hall of Fame. He also joined the National Collegiate Basketball Hall of Fame in 2022.

References

1936 births
High school basketball coaches in Iowa
High school basketball coaches in Colorado
Eastern Washington Eagles men's basketball coaches
National Association of Basketball Coaches
National Collegiate Athletic Association people
United States Military Academy faculty
National Collegiate Basketball Hall of Fame inductees
Living people